Yelah Qarshu or Yaleh Qarshu or Yaleh Qarshow or Yelehqarshow or Yeleh Qarshu may refer to:
 Yelah Qarshu, Bostanabad
 Yelah Qarshu, Hashtrud
 Yaleh Qarshow, Meyaneh